Ewa Urtnowska née Andrzejewska (born 18 January 1992) is a Polish handball player for MKS Lublin and the Polish national team.

She participated at the 2016 European Women's Handball Championship.

International honours 
Carpathian Trophy:
Winner: 2017

References

1992 births
Living people
Polish female handball players
Sportspeople from Gdańsk
Expatriate handball players
Polish expatriate sportspeople in France
21st-century Polish women